This is a list of Tamil national-type primary schools (SJK(T)) in Johor, Malaysia. As of June 2022, there are 71 Tamil primary schools with a total of 11,951 students.

List of Tamil national-type primary schools in Johor

Batu Pahat District

Johor Bahru District

Kluang District

Kota Tinggi District

Mersing District

Muar District

Pontian District

Segamat District

Kulai District

Tangkak District

See also 

 Tamil primary schools in Malaysia
 Lists of Tamil national-type primary schools in Malaysia

References 

Schools in Johor
Johor
Johor